Demons is a 1985 Italian horror film directed by Lamberto Bava, produced by Dario Argento, and starring Urbano Barberini and Natasha Hovey. Its plot follows two female university students who, along with a number of random people, are given complimentary tickets to a mysterious movie screening, where they soon find themselves trapped in the theater with a horde of ravenous demons.

The story was originally planned to be part of a three-story horror anthology film written by Dardano Sacchetti, but Bava took interest in the story more than the others, so he and Sacchetti began developing it into a separate feature. Argento, beginning to be interested in producing films, would contribute to the screenplay with Franco Ferrini, who was brought in by Argento. Filming took place in Berlin and Rome in the summer of 1985. The film features an instrumental score composed by Claudio Simonetti, as well as a soundtrack that includes songs by such artists as Mötley Crüe and Billy Idol.

Distributed by Titanus, Demons received a theatrical release in Italy in October 1985. It was followed by a 1986 sequel, Demons 2, also directed by Bava and produced by Argento. A third Demons film was conceived, but was completely rewritten and released as The Church (1989), directed by Michele Soavi.

Plot
On the Berlin subway, a mysterious, masked man offers university student Cheryl two tickets to a free screening at the Metropol, an isolated and recently renovated local cinema. Cheryl talks her friend Kathy into going with her; at the theater, they meet two preppy college boys, George and Ken. Other attendees of the screening include a blind man and his guide daughter; a married couple; a boyfriend and girlfriend; and a pimp named Tony along with his two prostitutes. One of the prostitutes, Rosemary, scratches her face with a bizarre mask that is on display in the lobby. The film being shown is a violent, disturbing horror film about four teenagers who discover an old tomb and dig up the grave of a sixteenth-century fortune-teller called Nostradamus. When the teenagers dig up Nostradamus's coffin, they find no body and instead an old book and a mask identical to the strange mask in the lobby. When one of the movie's characters puts the mask on and is scratched by it just like Rosemary was by its doppelganger, he then turns evil and slaughters his friends.

Feeling ill, Rosemary goes to the bathroom, where she transforms into a bloodthirsty, red-eyed demon similar to the one in the film. Rosemary attacks her friend, Carmen, who then transforms into a demon in front of the rest of the cinema-goers. The group of uninfected people race to any exit they can find, only to find that they have all been bricked up making escape impossible. Although they attempt to barricade themselves in the balcony, many are attacked and infected by the demons. One of the demons escapes into the city when four punks break into the building through a back entrance; the punks are soon transformed into demons as well.

In the cinema, only George and Cheryl remain uninfected. Using a display motorcycle and sword props from the foyer, they ride through the auditorium, slicing down many demons. George kills nearly all of them when suddenly, a helicopter crashes through the roof. George and Cheryl use an emergency grappling hook and winch to climb to the roof, where they are attacked by the mysterious man from the subway. They are able to kill him by impaling his head on an exposed bit of rebar. The two climb down to the street and discover that the demonic infection has spread throughout Berlin. They are then chased by a horde of demons before being picked up by a jeep of well-armed survivors. As they drive out of the city to safety, Cheryl (having been infected at some point in the theater) transforms into a demon. But before she can harm George, one of the jeep's survivors shoots with a shotgun, killing her. As Cheryl's body collapses into the roadway, George (the sole survivor of the cinema) and the survivalists drive out of the city to an unknown future.

Cast

 Urbano Barberini as George
 Natasha Hovey as Cheryl
 Karl Zinny as Ken
 Paola Cozzo as Kathy
 Nicoletta Elmi as Ingrid the Usherette 
 Fiore Argento as Hannah
 Geretta Giancarlo as Rosemary
 Michele Soavi as Man in Mask / Jerry (Horror Film)
 Bobby Rhodes as Tony the Pimp

Production

Development
Following the release of a giallo A Blade in the Dark, the action film Blastfighter, and the science fiction horror film Monster Shark, director Lamberto Bava considered writing a three part horror film anthology film written by Dardano Sacchetti, similar to his father's film Black Sabbath. One of the stories involved monsters that came from a movie theatre screen and attacked the audience, a story that Bava liked more than the other two and began developing it into a feature film.

Dardano and Bava took their 25-page treatment for the film to producer Fabrizio De Angelis, who wanted to use footage from Lucio Fulci's films as the film within a film to cut costs. The two would also take the treatment to Luciano Martino who suggested the two to produce the film themselves.  Meanwhile, Dario Argento, who was fresh from the financial success of Phenomena (1985) and was beginning to be interested in producing films as he had done previously with Dawn of the Dead. Argento began looking for films to produce, first reading a science fiction script from Luigi Cozzi which he was not convinced with, and then meeting with Bava who agreed to produce Demons.

Sacchetti was not content with Argento's suggestions for the script, later stating that Argento brought in Franco Ferrini who he felt only tried to please Argento. Ferrini stated his contributions to the script was to post-pone the appearance of the demons, which he said originally appeared much earlier in the film. Sacchetti then said Argento paid him and had him leave the project, only to invite him back towards the end to give the script a final polish. Sacchetti later remarked that the first half of the film's story was the same as the original script while the second half had more blood and gore and special effect scenes.

Filming
Demons was shot in nine weeks in June and July 1985. It was shot on location in Berlin and at De Paolis In.Ci.R. Studios in Rome.
The idea to have the demons eyes glow in the film came to Bava on set, who said when filming a scene where the demons approach the camera involved the actors wearing refractive paper which caused the effect.

Special effects were handled by Sergio Stivaletti who also worked on Argento's Opera.

Soundtrack
The soundtrack was released on LP, and features 1980s rock and heavy metal themes. The soundtrack was performed live for the film's thirty-year anniversary at Shock Pop Comiccon in February 2015. The instrumental soundtrack was composed by Claudio Simonetti.

Track listing
 Billy Idol - "White Wedding"
 Accept - "Fast as a Shark"
 Mötley Crüe - "Save Our Souls"
 Claudio Simonetti - "Demon"
 Claudio Simonetti - "Killing"
 Claudio Simonetti - "Out of Time"
 Rick Springfield - "Walking on the Edge"
 Pretty Maids - "Night Danger" (US movie version)
 Go West - "We Close Our Eyes"
 The Adventures - "Send My Heart"
 Saxon - "Everybody Up"

Release
Demons was distributed theatrically in Italy by Titanus on 4 October 1985. The film grossed a total of 1,225,490,000 Italian lire domestically, making it the 39th highest-grossing film in Italy that year, more than Cat's Eye, Silver Bullet and A Nightmare on Elm Street. The film was distributed elsewhere in the world in 1986 including the United States, France and Hong Kong. The film was planned to be released in the United Kingdom but its release was seemingly canceled.

Reception

In a contemporary review, Kim Newman stated in The Monthly Film Bulletin that "Demons suffers from the same uncertain, over-emphatic tone that brought down producer Dario Argento's own Phenomena" and that "the film has horror effects aplenty-gory deaths, transformations into dribbling monsters, a demon bursting out of a girl's back - and an interesting set of ideas and situations, but flounders badly as it tried to build up a high energy cumulative effect".

Demons holds a 64% approval rating on review aggregator website Rotten Tomatoes based on 11 reviews, with a weighted average of 6.10/10. Leonard Maltin gave the film 1 1/2 out of 4 stars, criticizing the film's lack of characterizations, logic and plot.

The film was listed at number 53 on American TV channel Bravo's The 100 Scariest Movie Moments countdown.

From retrospective reviews, Newman commented in Sight & Sound that the film was "the sort of picture it takes at least four people [...] to write: it isn't so much scripted as assembled" noting "one note characters". Newman commented on the series stating that they "have many problems of 80s cinema: everyone wears a puffy jacket and has puffier hair, characters like the coke snorting punks of Demons and the bad boy/bad driver of Demons 2 come from middle aged imagination rather than he streets of Berlin". Newman concluded that both Demons and its sequel were "chaotic, inconsistent, blithely indifferent to storytelling and as prone to cack-handed unintentional comedy as gross out horror, these are guilty pleasures, but their demented glee makes them - aptly - ideal party horror movies".

Sequel

Following the commercial success of Demons, Argento and his collaborators began work on a sequel titled Demons 2 which was released on October 9, 1986 in Italy. Bava spoke of a second sequel as early as January 22, 1988 with Argento stating it would be called Ritorno alla casa dei demoni The project for the third film later changed hands to eventually become The Church directed by Michele Soavi. Bava's television film The Ogre was released outside of Italy as Demons III: The Ogre.

See also 
 List of Italian films of 1985
 List of horror films of 1985

References

Footnotes

Sources

External links
 
 

1985 films
1985 horror films
1980s monster movies
1980s Italian-language films
Apocalyptic films
Demons in film
Films scored by Claudio Simonetti
Films directed by Lamberto Bava
Italian zombie films
Films set in Berlin
Films set in West Germany
Films set in a movie theatre
Films shot in Rome
Films shot in Berlin
Films with screenplays by Dario Argento
Self-reflexive films
Italian supernatural horror films
1980s exploitation films
Italian splatter films
1980s English-language films
1980s Italian films